Henrik Vasbányai (born 16 July 1991) is a Hungarian canoeist. He had his best results in two-man and four-man events, together with Róbert Mike. Between 2013 and 2015 they won one gold and three silver medals at the world championships. They placed fourth at the 2016 Olympics. In 2014 Vasbányai was named Male Canoeist of the Year by the Hungarian Canoe Federation.

References

1991 births
Living people
Hungarian male canoeists
Olympic canoeists of Hungary
Canoeists at the 2016 Summer Olympics
Place of birth missing (living people)
Canoeists at the 2015 European Games
European Games competitors for Hungary
21st-century Hungarian people